"I Love You" is a song by American recording artist Faith Evans. It was written by Anthony Best, Michael Jamison, Bobby Springsteen, and Jennifer Lopez and recorded by Evans for her third studio album Faithfully (2001). Production on the song was overseen by Buckwild, Mario Winans and Sean "P. Diddy" Combs. Initially written for Lopez's second studio J.Lo (2001), the contemporary R&B ballad samples singer Isaac Hayes' 1976 record "Make a Little Love to Me" and finds Evans, as the protagonist, confessing her love and dignity to a man who has yet to find a heart for her.

The song was released as the second single from the album on February 19, 2002 in the United States. "I Love You" peaked at number fourteen on the US Billboard Hot 100 and at number two on the US Hot R&B/Hip-Hop Songs chart, marking Evans' highest-charting single on the latter chart since "Never Gonna Let You Go" (1999) as well as Faithfullys highest single peak. An accompanying music video for "I Love You" was directed by Matthew Rolston and Evans and her lover in a lavishly decorated Japanese Buddhist house during winter time.

Background
"I Love You" was written by Anthony Best, Bobby Springsteen, Jennifer Lopez, and Michael Jamison and produced by Buckwild, Mario Winans and Sean "P. Diddy" Combs. The ballad contains a sample from the song "Make a Little Love to Me" (1976) by American singer Isaac Hayes. Due to the inclusion of the sample, Isaac is also credited as songwriters. Born out of the former relationship between Combs and Lopez, the latter of which holds partial songwriter credits, was originally set to record the song for her second studio J.Lo (2001). Evans confirmed, that "it almost slipped through the cracks and ended up on her album."

Chart performance
The song entered the U.S. Billboard Hot 100 songs chart and the U.S. Radio Songs chart the same week, both spending twenty-one weeks. On the week of April 6, 2002, it peaked at number fourteen on the Billboard Hot 100 (becoming her fourth top twenty single on the chart) while it reached thirteen on the Radio Songs chart. The song also appeared on the U.S. R&B/Hip-Hop Songs chart, remaining on the chart for thirty weeks and peaking at number two on March 16, 2002, becoming her highest charting single on the chart since her 1999 song "Never Gonna Let You Go."

Music video
The music video for the song was directed by Matthew Rolston and was released on February 4, 2002. The clip starts with an outside view of a lavishly decorated house during winter time. When the first chorus begins, Evans is seen singing while laying on a bed. During the second chorus and throughout the rest of the video, it intercuts scenes of her on the bed and her standing outside wearing a furcoat.

Track listing

Vinyl single
"I Love You" (Radio Mix) — 4:21
"I Love You" (Instrumental) — 4:24
"You Gets No Love" (Instrumental) — 4:48
"You Gets No Love" (Extended Club Mix) — 4:33
"You Gets No Love" (Extended Rap Mix) — 4:48
"You Gets No Love" (Extended Radio Mix) — 4:33

CD maxi single
"I Love You" (Radio Edit) — 4:02
"I Love You" (Album Version) — 4:24
"You Gets No Love" (Remix featuring G. Dep) — 4:01
"I Love You" (Music video) — 4:00

Credits and personnel 
Credits adapted from the liner notes of Faithfully.

Buckwild – producer, writer
P. Diddy – producer, recording
Faith Evans – vocals
Isaac Hayes – writer
Hijack – keyboards

Michael Jamison – writer
Brian Kraz – engineering assistant
Paul Logus – mixing
Jennifer Lopez – writer
Bobby Springsteen – writer

Charts

Weekly charts

Year-end charts

Release history

References

External links
"I Love You" at YouTube

2002 singles
Bad Boy Records singles
Faith Evans songs
Music videos directed by Matthew Rolston
Songs written by Isaac Hayes
Songs written by Jennifer Lopez
Songs written by Buckwild (music producer)
Song recordings produced by Buckwild (music producer)
2001 songs
Songs written by Faith Evans
Contemporary R&B ballads
Soul ballads
2000s ballads